The Diplôme d'études universitaires générales (French for General Academic Studies Degree), abbreviated DEUG, was a French undergraduate degree that required two years of studies, roughly equivalent to associate degree. 

History

Creation 
The DEUG was created in 1973 by the government department of Joseph Fontanet, and replaces the various diplomas and undergraduate studies in each faculty: the general legal diploma, the general economic diploma, the degree of literary studies and the degree of scientific studies.
According to the decree of creation, the DEUG "sanctions a multidisciplinary undergraduate general education and guidance", "lessons aim to develop in students the skills and knowledge to: the expression and realization ; understanding of the contemporary world, the study and use of concepts and scientific methods". Regarding the opportunities of this degree, "the lessons are organized to allow students who are studying to be admitted to a graduate or graduate, or at another university, students who do not pursue can directly enter the workforce". The courses leading to this degree span two years and only one time twice a year is normally permitted.
Orders of 1 March 1973 set the agenda of the general university degree in six mentions: law, economics, economic and social administration, humanities (with sections philosophy, sociology, psychology, history and geography), science (sections: science and structures of matter, the natural sciences and life). Educational programs include 50 to 60% of required courses defined by national laws for each section and mention, they also have at least 5% of modern language teaching and 30 to 40% over the choice of universities with 10 to 20% of courses from outside the section or the main entry to the choice of students, such as "sociology and social psychology" for students of the word "science". According to the statements, the total minimum teaching for this degree is 700 to 1100 hours.

From 1993 to 1997 
Between 1993 and 1997, the DEUG was governed by the decree of 26 May 1992. This applies from the start of 1993 (Reform Jospin).
This DEUG was open to any holder of Baccalauréat or equivalent. It was organized in two levels. The lessons are grouped by modules. The first year included a tutorial. Universities should organize two examination sessions per year.
Only three annual entrants were allowed to graduate unless exceptions.
Students of institut universitaire professionnalisé also received a DEUG at the end of their first year.
The DEUG included ten areas:

 The Industrial Technology DEUG the program is determined by arrêté;
 The DEUG Sciences whose program is fixed by arrêté;
The Arts DEUG the program is determined by arrêté;
 The Theology DEUG the program is determined by arrêté;
 The DEUG Social Sciences whose program is fixed by arrêté;
 The DEUG Arts and languages in which the program is determined by arrêté;
The Law DEUG the program is determined by arrêté;
 DEUG the Economic and Social Administration, whose program is fixed by arrêté;
 The DEUG Economics and Management whose program is fixed by arrêté;
The DEUG science and technology of sport and physical activity in which the program is determined by arrêté.

From 1997 to Bologna Process 

Before the Bologna Process, the DEUG was governed by the decree of 9 April 1997. This applied since September 1997 (Bayrou reform), it is also still in force today.
This DEUG is open to any holder of Baccalauréat or equivalent. It is organized into four semesters, the first being a half of orientation. The lessons are grouped by academic units. The first year included a tutorial. Universities must conduct two examination sessions. Access is made in the second year if the student had validated 70% of the first year (and 80% of DEUG enough to access the Bachelor, but did not get the degree).
Only three annual entrants were allowed to graduate unless exceptions.
The DEUG included nine areas:

 The Science and Technology DEUG the program is determined by arrêté;
 The Arts DEUG the program is determined by arrêté;
 The Theology DEUG the program is determined by arrêté;
 The DEUG Social Sciences whose program is fixed by arrêté;
 The DEUG Arts and languages in which the program is determined by arrêté;
 The Law DEUG the program is determined by arrêté;
 DEUG the Economic and Social Administration, whose program is fixed by arrêté;
 The DEUG Economics and Management whose program is fixed by arrêté;
The DEUG science and technology of sport and physical activity (sport science) the program is determined by arrêté.

Since Bologna Process 
Since the implementation of the Bologna Process (2003 to 2006 depending on the university), the DEUG is a diploma through the Bachelor's degree. It is issued if students are successfully completed double degrees first four (of six) semesters and receive one diploma with both major fields.
Areas and programs are no longer set nationally, but universities have often taken existing titles.

References 

General Academic Studies
Education in France